25I-NBMD (NBMD-2C-I, Cimbi-29) is a derivative of the phenethylamine hallucinogen 2C-I, discovered in 2006 by a team at Purdue University led by David Nichols. It acts as a potent partial agonist for the 5HT2A receptor with a Ki of 0.049 nM at the human 5HT2A receptor. The corresponding 4-bromo analogue 25B-NBMD has been used for molecular dynamics studies on the shape of the 5-HT2A receptor.

Legality

Sweden
The Riksdag added 25I-NBMD to Narcotic Drugs Punishments Act under swedish schedule I ("substances, plant materials and fungi which normally do not have medical use") as of January 16, 2015, published by Medical Products Agency (MPA) in regulation LVFS 2014:11 listed as 25I-NBMD, and 2-(4-jodo-2,5-dimetoxifenyl)-N-[(2,3-metylendioxifenyl)metyl]etanamin.

United Kingdom

Analogues and derivatives

References 

25-NB (psychedelics)
Benzodioxoles
Designer drugs
Iodoarenes
Serotonin receptor agonists